Michael League (born April 24, 1984) is an American composer, producer, and multi-instrumentalist. He is the bandleader of New York-based instrumental band Snarky Puppy and the international music ensemble Bokanté. He also founded the band Forq with keyboardist Henry Hey, and is also an owner and founder of the record label GroundUP Music. League has won five Grammy Awards.

Early life 
League was born in California on April 24, 1984. He had an attraction to music from an early age and began playing guitar at 13 years old. He started playing bass at age 17, when he was requested to do so in his senior high school jazz band. He was raised Catholic.

League went on to study jazz at the University of North Texas, then spent three years playing in Dallas's Gospel and R&B scene under the unofficial mentorship of keyboardist Bernard Wright. There he performed with gospel artists like Walter Hawkins, Kirk Franklin, Marvin Sapp, Myron Butler & Levi, and Israel Houghton, and frequently performed at the Potter's House. He was also a regular member of Erykah Badu's backing band, the Gritz. League moved to Brooklyn, New York in 2009.

Career 
League formed Snarky Puppy in his freshman year of college at the University of North Texas, originally consisting of him and nine of his peers. He composed most of their original music, as well as produced all albums released by the band.

He has performed or recorded with artists from a variety of genres including Laura Mvula, Lalah Hathaway, Joe Walsh, Chris Thile, Michael McDonald, Terence Blanchard, Esperanza Spalding, Joshua Redman, Wayne Krantz, Chris Potter, Salif Keita, Eliades Ochoa, Fatoumata Diawara, Bassekou Kouyate, Susana Baca, and Kardeş Türküler. He currently served as musical director for David Crosby in his Lighthouse touring band, alongside Becca Stevens and Michelle Willis.

In 2014, League won his first Grammy Award for Best R&B Performance with Snarky Puppy and Lalah Hathaway for a live performance of the Brenda Russell and David Foster song "Something" on the Family Dinner – Volume 1 album. In 2016, Sylva, the collaborative album between Snarky Puppy and the Metropole Orkest and conducted by Jules Buckley, won a Grammy Award for Best Contemporary Instrumental Album, as did the band's follow-up album, Culcha Vulcha in 2017.;  Snarky Puppy's 2020 album Live at the Royal Albert Hall, recorded before a sold-out crowd at the historic London venue, won the 2021 Grammy Award for Best Contemporary Instrumental Album.

League formed the world/blues ensemble Bokanté in 2016, and has produced two albums for the band: Strange Circles, and What Heat. Strange Circles was released on GroundUP Music and What Heat, also a collaboration with Jules Buckley and the Metropole Orkest, was released on September 28, 2018, on Real World Records. In 2019, What Heat was nominated in the Grammy Award for Best World Music Album category.

One number on David Crosby's League-produced Lighthouse album featured Crosby, League, Becca Stevens, and Michelle Willis (with Bill Laurence on piano). The quartet became the Lighthouse Band on Crosby's 2018 Here If You Listen album. The band then toured for six weeks in November and December 2018.

League relocated to Catalonia, Spain in 2020.

In 2021, League released his debut solo album So Many Me on GroundUP Music. League himself performed every instrument on the album, including vocals, synthesizer, and various Turkish, Moroccan, and Kurdish percussion instruments. The album received critical acclaim.

Selected production work
Michael League has worked as producer or co-producer on 42 albums for artists including:

 David Crosby
 David Crosby, Michelle Willis, Becca Stevens, & Michael League
 Snarky Puppy (all thirteen albums)
 Bokanté + Metropole Orkest (conducted by Jules Buckley)
 Susana Baca
 Becca Stevens
 Bill Laurance
 Forq
 Lucy Woodward
 Alison Wedding
 Malika Tirolien
 Gisela João

GroundUP Music Festival 
In 2017, the GroundUP Music Festival, also known as GUMFest, debuted within the grounds of the North Beach Band Shell in North Beach, Miami. The first GroundUP Music Festival was initiated by Andy Hurwitz, directed by Paul Lehr, and artistically directed by Michael League. The festival features performances by Snarky Puppy all three nights, with a line-up curated by League that has featured David Crosby, Béla Fleck and the Flecktones, The Wood Brothers, Robert Glasper, Knower, Concha Buika, C4 Trio, Pedrito Martinez, Jojo Mayer + Nerve, Mark Guiliana's Beat Music, John Medeski's Mad Skillet, Charlie Hunter Trio, Laura Mvula, Eliades Ochoa, Esperanza Spalding, Lionel Loueke, Joshua Redman and Terence Blanchard, as well as the full GroundUP Music roster, among others. GroundUP Music Festival, Miami, is now planned as an annual event.

References

1984 births
Living people
21st-century American composers
American jazz guitarists
American Roman Catholics
Grammy Award winners
21st-century American guitarists
University of North Texas alumni
Snarky Puppy members
Forq members